Pleioptygma carolinense is an extinct species of sea snail, a marine gastropod mollusk in the family Pleioptygmatidae.

Pleioptygma carolinensis is the type species of the genus Pleioptygma.

Distribution 
This species is found in the Pliocene deposits of North Carolina. The type locality is Duplin County, North Carolina.

Description 
The type description of Pleioptygma carolinensis originally described as Voluta carolinensis by Timothy Abbott Conrad (1840) reads as follows:

References
This article incorporates public domain text from the reference 

Pleioptygmatidae
Pliocene gastropods
Gastropods described in 1840